Sanjaasürengiin Zorig (20 April 1962 – 2 October 1998) was a Mongolian politician who played a prominent role in leading the country's 1990 democratic revolution. His supporters called him the "Golden Magpie of Democracy". After his death, his sister Oyuun entered politics and founded the Civic Will Party.

Early life 
Zorig's grandfather was Russian geographer and ethnographer A. D. Simukov who had come to Mongolia as part of an expedition headed by Pyotr Kozlov. Zorig's grandfather was a victim of Marshal Choibalsan's purges, leaving his daughter Dorjpalam, Zorig's mother, an orphan. Dorjpalam starred in a popular Mongolian movie before marrying Sanjaasüren, a Mongolian State University professor and a Buryat (a Mongolian ethnic minority). Zorig was the second of their three children.

From 1970 on, Zorig attended middle school No. 23 in Ulaanbaatar, one of the city's Russian-language schools. From 1980 to 1985 he studied philosophy at Moscow's Lomonosov Moscow State University. Afterwards, he worked for a year as an instructor for the Mongolian Revolutionary Youth League in Ulaanbaatar, and in 1986 became lecturer for scientific communism at the Mongolian State University. He became an accomplished chess player, later serving as president of the Mongolian Chess Federation. In 1988 he founded the "New Generation" group; a group of young dissidents dedicated to spreading democracy in Mongolia.

Political career

Democratic Revolution

In 1989 and 1990, Zorig played a leading role in the events that led to Mongolia's adoption of a multi-party system. On 10 December 1989, a month after the fall of the Berlin Wall, Zorig led a group of 200 activists in a public protest demanding a free-market economy and free elections. In January 1990 Zorig and his fellow Mongolian Democrat dissidents began staging weekend protests in Sükhbaatar Square, the center of Ulaanbaatar. The protests started small but grew into large crowds as January passed into February. Tensions increased as the crowds swelled and the Communist government debated crushing them with force. At one point when protesters were scuffling with soldiers and an outbreak of violence seemed likely, Zorig took a megaphone, sat atop a friend's shoulders to make himself visible to the crowd, and called for calm. Violence was averted. The picture of Zorig addressing the protesters became a famous symbol of Mongolia's peaceful revolution. In March, the Mongolian Politburo resigned and one-party rule in Mongolia ended.

After the revolution
In June 1990, Zorig was elected into the People's Great Khural. In August 1991, he was the only prominent Mongolian politician to immediately denounce the coup attempt by Soviet hardliners against Mikhail Gorbachev. He was elected into the State Great Khural both in 1992 and 1996, the first time as a minority member and the second time as a member of the Democratic Union that swept into power as Mongolia's first non-Communist government since the 1921 Communist revolution. Zorig questioned the pace of free-market reforms in Mongolia after the Democrats came to power, believing the reforms weren't fair and would push too many Mongolians below the poverty line. In 1998 he became Mongolia's Minister for Infrastructure.

The year 1998 was a year of political crisis in Mongolia. Tsakhiagiin Elbegdorj became the new Prime Minister of Mongolia in April 1998, and in one of his first decisions he sold the state-owned Reconstruction Bank to the private Golomt Bank, which was owned by Mongolian Democrats. Members of the Mongolian People's Revolutionary Party walked out in protest, and, without a working majority in Parliament, Elbegdorj was forced to resign. The parties conferred and in closed meetings agreed on Infrastructure Minister S. Zorig as a compromise candidate to be the new Prime Minister. The announcement was scheduled for Monday, 5 October.

Assassination
Zorig was murdered on Friday, 2 October 1998. Two assailants entered his apartment, tied up his girlfriend Bulgan, and waited. As soon as Zorig stepped through the door they jumped him, stabbing him sixteen times, including three stab wounds to the heart. Strangely, they stole a bottle of vinegar and a bottle of soy sauce from the refrigerator before fleeing the apartment. Four days after the murder, mourners crowded Sukhbaatar Square, holding candlelight vigils. His body lay in the Government House before his burial on Wednesday, 7 October. The government crisis lingered for another two months until Janlavyn Narantsatsralt, the mayor of Ulaanbaatar, was finally named the new Prime Minister in December 1998.

His murder remained unsolved for 19 years until December 2016, leading to speculation that someone with insider knowledge of Zorig's impending elevation to the post of Prime Minister took action to prevent it. Zorig's wife Bulgan came under suspicion and was briefly held by police, but no charges were ever brought.

Aftermath

Zorig's sister Sanjaasürengiin Oyuun was elected to his seat in the Mongolian parliament soon after his assassination. She later served as Mongolia's Minister of Foreign Affairs. The political party founded by his sister Oyuun, the Irgenii Zorig Nam or Civic Will Party, bears a reference to his name.

A statue for him has been erected in Ulaanbaatar, across the street from the Central Post Office. The statue faces toward the Government Palace, symbolising Zorig's morning walk toward his workplace. Flowers are placed at the statue every year on the day of his death, attended by his family members, friends, politicians, and other citizens.

The Zorig Foundation, founded in October 1998 shortly after S. Zorig's murder, exists today as "a Mongolian non-profit organization promoting democracy through social action, youth activities, and good governance programs."

Murder case trial
In December 2016, the district court in a closed hearing has convicted three individuals Ts. Amgalanbaatar, D. Sodnomdarjaa and T. Chimgee of the 1998 murder. The panel of judges issued a guilty verdict after the hearing that was held over a period of 6 weeks. The defendants were each given prison sentences of between 24 and 25 years to be carried in a strict regime prison. In March 2017, the Criminal Appeals Court of Ulaanbaatar has rejected the appeal of the 3 defendants after confirming that the testimony by the convicts D. Sodnomdarjaa and Ts. Amgalanbaatar given during the investigation regarding the case and the facts, as well as the hand-written testament by B. Sodnomdarjaa correspond to the testimonies of the relevant witnesses, material evidences from the site of the case, notes taken during the investigation at the site of the crime, as well as the conclusions of the experts regarding bodily injuries of the victim.

Then deputy prime minister Tsendiin Nyamdorj, some other politicians and victim's family members questioned the decision to hold the trial behind closed doors. In December 2017, the Cabinet of Mongolia permitted to declassify the majority of this murder case file consisting of 14,926 pages while 74 pages of materials were to be kept classified. The declassified documents had been transferred from the General Intelligence Agency of Mongolia to the Archive of Criminal Cases Database under the Supreme Court of Mongolia. The crime remains unsolved; many believe corrupt parliament members hired people to kill him.

References

Citations

Sources

External links

 Biography on the Zorig Foundation website

1962 births
1998 deaths
Assassinated Mongolian politicians
Deaths by stabbing in Mongolia
Democratic Party (Mongolia) politicians
Members of the State Great Khural
Mongolian activists
Mongolian expatriates in the Soviet Union
Moscow State University alumni
People murdered in Mongolia
Mongolian murder victims
Mongolian people of Russian descent
Buryat people
Academic staff of the National University of Mongolia